Women Who Work may refer to:

 Women Who Work (1938 film), an Argentine comedy film
 Women Who Work (1953 film), a Mexican drama film
 Women Who Work (book), a 2017 book by Ivanka Trump

See also 
 Women in the workforce